Leonard Shenoff Randle (born February 12, 1949) is a former Major League Baseball player. He was the first-round pick of the Washington Senators in the secondary phase of the June 1970 Major League Baseball draft, tenth overall.

Early years
Born in Long Beach, California, Randle was captain of both the baseball and football teams at Centennial High School in Los Angeles. He was drafted by the St. Louis Cardinals in the 1967 Major League Baseball draft, but chose instead to attend Arizona State University. Along with playing football and second base for the  NCAA championship Arizona State Sun Devils baseball team, Randle graduated with a Bachelor of Science degree.

Washington Senators and Texas Rangers

He had a breakthrough  season, when he batted .302 with 26 stolen bases and 65 runs scored splitting time at second base, third base and in the outfield.

1977 punching incident
During spring training in 1977, first round draft choice Bump Wills earned the starting second base job over Randle. On March 28, the Rangers were in Orlando for an exhibition game with the Minnesota Twins. During batting practice an hour before the first pitch, Randle approached Rangers manager Frank Lucchesi. Randle claimed that Lucchesi called him a "punk", which Lucchesi denies. Randle punched Lucchesi in the face three times before the altercation was stopped by bystanders.

Lucchesi was hospitalized for a week, needing plastic surgery to repair his fractured cheekbone which Randle had broken in three places. He also received bruises to his kidney and back. The Rangers suspended Randle for 30 days without pay and fined him $10,000. On April 26, before the suspension was complete, Texas traded him to the New York Mets for cash and a  player to be named later; Texas later received Rick Auerbach.

Randle was charged with assault, and pleaded no contest to battery charges in a Florida court, receiving a $1,050 fine. The Texas Rangers fired Lucchesi on June 21. Lucchesi sued Randle for $200,000. They settled for $20,000.

New York Mets
Randle began his tenure with the Mets playing second base. With opening day third baseman Roy Staiger batting only .236 with one home run and eight runs batted in, Randle was shifted to third base by Joe Torre when he replaced Joe Frazier as manager of the team.

Randle ended an extra innings marathon with the Montreal Expos on July 9 at Shea Stadium in the seventeenth inning with a walk off home run off Will McEnaney. Four days later, he was at bat for the Mets when the power went out at Shea Stadium during the New York City blackout of 1977. He commented, "I thought, 'God, I'm gone.' I thought for sure He was calling me. I thought it was my last at‐bat."

For the season, Randle batted .304, stole 33 bases and scored 78 runs for the last place Mets.

1979 season
The Mets released Randle during spring training in 1979. Shortly afterwards, he signed with the San Francisco Giants and was assigned to their triple A Pacific Coast League affiliate in Phoenix. He was traded along with Bill Madlock and Dave Roberts from the Giants to the Pittsburgh Pirates for Al Holland, Ed Whitson and Fred Breining on June 28, but again was assigned to their triple A affiliate. After 24 games with the Portland Beavers, he saw his first major league experience of the season when his contract was purchased by the New York Yankees. He batted .179 in twenty games as an outfielder with the Yankees.

Seattle Mariners

Randle signed with the Seattle Mariners during spring training in 1980. By the end of spring training, he was dealt to the Chicago Cubs. He batted .276 and tied his career high five home runs as the Cubs' regular third baseman. Following the season, he returned to the Mariners as a free agent. In two seasons with the Mariners, he batted .223 with four home runs backing up second and third base.

With the Kansas City Royals visiting the Kingdome on May 27, Royals centerfielder Amos Otis hit a slow roller down the third base line in the sixth inning. Randle got on his hands and knees and blew the ball foul; the umpires disallowed his action, and ruled it fair. Afterwards, Randle said that there was a "no-blow rule" implemented. He jokingly said, "They won the game, we won the protest."

In a 12-year, 1138 game major league career, Randle batted .257 (1016-for-3950) with 27 home runs, 488 runs scored and 322 RBI.

Italian baseball
In , he became the first American major league player to play baseball in Italy. He holds the record for the longest home run in the Italian Serie-A1 league, most home runs and singles hit in a three-game series and the most hits in a three-game series. He won a batting title in Italy with a .477 batting average.

Following his stint in Italy, he played with the St. Petersburg Pelicans in the Senior Professional Baseball Association.

References

External links
, or Baseball Almanac, or Ultimate Mets Database, or Baseball Gauge, or Pura Pelota : VPBL batting statistics

1949 births
Living people
African-American baseball players
Arizona State Sun Devils baseball players
Baseball players from Long Beach, California
Chicago Cubs players
Denver Bears players
American expatriate baseball players in Italy
Leones del Caracas players
Major League Baseball outfielders
Major League Baseball second basemen
Major League Baseball third basemen
New York Mets players
New York Yankees players
Phoenix Giants players
Portland Beavers players
Seattle Mariners players
Spokane Indians players
St. Petersburg Pelicans players
Sun City Rays players
Texas Rangers players
Washington Senators (1961–1971) players
American expatriate baseball players in Venezuela
Nettuno Baseball Club players
Fortitudo Baseball Bologna players
21st-century African-American people
20th-century African-American sportspeople